Ala Sar (also Romanized as Ālā Sar) is a village in Rud Pish Rural District, in the Central District of Fuman County, Gilan Province, Iran. At the 2006 census, its population was 276, in 94 families.

References 

Populated places in Fuman County